Khani (Xani) is an urban locality (an urban-type settlement) in Neryungrinsky District of the Sakha Republic, Russia, located  from Neryungri, the administrative center of the district, in close proximity to the borders with Amur Oblast and Zabaykalsky Krai. As of the 2010 Census, its population was 764.

History
It was founded in the late 1970s, during the construction of the Baikal–Amur Mainline, and was granted urban-type settlement status in 1981. Around two thirds of the residents left after the completion of the railway in the late 1980s, with the population dropping drastically between 1989 and present.

Administrative and municipal status
Within the framework of administrative divisions, the urban-type settlement of Khani is incorporated within Neryungrinsky District as the Settlement of Khani. As a municipal division, the Settlement of Khani is incorporated within Neryungrinsky Municipal District as Khani Urban Settlement.

References

Notes

Sources
Official website of the Sakha Republic. Registry of the Administrative-Territorial Divisions of the Sakha Republic. Neryungrinsky District. 

Urban-type settlements in the Sakha Republic